Tharid (also known as trid, taghrib, tashreeb or thareed)  is a bread soup from Arab cuisine found in many Arab countries. Like other bread soups, it a simple meal of broth and bread in this instance crumbled flatbread moistened with broth or stew. Historically, the flatbread used was probably stale and unleavened. As an Arab national dish it is considered strongly evocative of Arab identity during the lifetime of the Islamic prophet Muhammad. According to a widespread legend, this unremarkable and humble dish was the prophet's favorite food.

It is especially consumed in the holy month of Ramadan.

Origin
The dish belongs to Arabian cultures. The dish is notable in that it was mentioned in a number of hadith attributed to the Islamic prophet Muhammad, in which he said that tharid was the best among all dishes, and that it was superior to other dishes in the way that Aishah was superior to other women.

Spread
Tharid is not only widespread in the Arabian Peninsula, but also in North Africa, where it is known as trid; Turkey, where it is known as tirit; and even in Xinjiang, where it is known as terit. Multiple variations of the recipe were brought to Spain by the Moors. The Moroccan rfissa is created by layering cooked meat between paper-thin layers of pastry dough (warqa). In Syria, a similar dish named fatteh is made by a mix of roasted and minced flatbread with yogurt and cooked meat. In Indonesia, tharid is known via Malay cuisine, due to Arab influences on Malay culinary culture.

Consumption
Dipping the bread into the broth, and eating it with the meat is the simplest method of eating tharid. Another variation involves stacking the bread and the meat in several layers.

Gallery

See also
 Tajine
 Tanjia
 Harira
 Couscous
 Bastilla

References

Notes
 Alan Davidson: The Oxford Companion to Food, 2nd. ed. Oxford 2006, Article Tharid, P. 794

Stews
Arab cuisine
Indonesian cuisine
Moroccan cuisine
Indonesian Arab cuisine
Malay cuisine
Turkish stews
Indonesian stews
National dishes